Rafael Marques Mariano (born 27 May 1983), known as Rafael Marques, is a Brazilian footballer who plays for Ventforet Kofu as a forward.

He gained Turkish citizenship with the name Rafet El when playing for Manisaspor.

Club career

Early career
Born in Araraquara, São Paulo, Rafael Marques started his senior career with Campinas. In 2003 he joined Série A side Ponte Preta, and scored his first goal for the club on 8 October in a 2–2 home draw against Atlético Paranaense.

In 2004 Rafael Marques signed for Palmeiras, but acted mainly as a backup to Muñoz and Vágner Love during his spell. He subsequently represented Inter de Limeira, which he left on 18 April 2005. Two days later, he joined Marília.

Turkey
In 2005 Rafael Marques moved abroad for the first time in his career, signing with Samsunspor. He made his Süper Lig debut on 11 September in a 1–1 home draw against Manisaspor, and scored his first goal late in the month in a 2–1 home loss against Galatasaray.

In August 2006, after his team's relegation, Rafael Marques agreed to a contract with Manisaspor, suffering the same fate in his second season. During the 2008–09 campaign, he contributed with twelve goals as his side was crowned champions and returned to the first division at first attempt.

Omiya Ardija
In August 2009, Rafael Marques was announced at Omiya Ardija. He scored regularly for the side during his spell, including a ten-goal mark during the 2011 season; highlights included a brace in a 3–1 away defeat of Kashiwa Reysol on 25 September 2011.

Botafogo / Henan Jianye
On 10 July 2012, Rafael Marques signed a three-and-a-half-year contract with Botafogo back in his home country. After spending his first six months without scoring, he finished the 2013 Campeonato Brasileiro Série A with ten goals, being the club's top goalscorer.

On 21 January 2014, Rafael Marques switched teams and countries again, joining Henan Jianye in the Chinese Super League.

Palmeiras
On 12 January 2015, Rafael Marques returned to Palmeiras on a one-year loan deal. A regular starter, he featured in 32 league matches and scored seven goals during the year.

On 13 January 2016, Rafael Marques signed a permanent two-year deal with Verdão. However, he would spend the campaign as a backup to Róger Guedes and Gabriel Jesus as his side lifted the league trophy after 22 years.

In March 2017, after the arrival of Miguel Borja, Rafael Marques was being deemed surplus to requirements by manager Eduardo Baptista, being transfer-listed by the club.

Cruzeiro
On 13 May 2017, Rafael Marques signed an 18-month contract with fellow top tier club Cruzeiro, with Mayke moving in the opposite direction on loan.

In December 2018, after a spell with Sport, Marques joined Campeonato Paulista side São Caetano.

Club statistics

Honours
Manisaspor
TFF First League: 2008–09

Botafogo
Campeonato Carioca: 2013

Palmeiras
Copa do Brasil: 2015
Campeonato Brasileiro Série A: 2016

References

External links

Palmeiras' Official Profile

1983 births
Living people
People from Araraquara
Brazilian emigrants to Turkey
Naturalized citizens of Turkey
Turkish people of Brazilian descent
Brazilian people of Turkish descent
Brazilian footballers
Association football forwards
Campeonato Brasileiro Série A players
Campeonato Brasileiro Série B players
Sport Club Barueri players
Associação Atlética Ponte Preta players
Sociedade Esportiva Palmeiras players
Associação Atlética Internacional (Limeira) players
Marília Atlético Clube players
Botafogo de Futebol e Regatas players
Cruzeiro Esporte Clube players
Associação Desportiva São Caetano players
Sport Club do Recife players
Figueirense FC players
Süper Lig players
TFF First League players
Samsunspor footballers
Manisaspor footballers
J1 League players
Omiya Ardija players
Chinese Super League players
Henan Songshan Longmen F.C. players
J2 League players
Ventforet Kofu players
Brazilian expatriate footballers
Brazilian expatriate sportspeople in Turkey
Brazilian expatriate sportspeople in Japan
Brazilian expatriate sportspeople in China
Expatriate footballers in Turkey
Expatriate footballers in Japan
Expatriate footballers in China
Footballers from São Paulo (state)
Converts to Islam